The 1922 Michigan State Normal Normalites football team represented Michigan State Normal College (later renamed Eastern Michigan University) during the 1922 college football season.  In their second and final season under head coach Joseph McCulloch, the Normalites compiled a record of 3–2–2 (1–2 against Michigan Intercollegiate Athletic Association opponents) and outscored all opponents by a combined total of 31 to 28. Percy R. Pray was the team captain.

Schedule

References

Michigan State Normal
Eastern Michigan Eagles football seasons
Michigan State Normal Normalites football